Vacant Possession is a 1995 Australian drama film directed and written by Margot Nash and starring Pamela Rabe and John Stanton. The film was nominated for 5 awards at the 1995 Australian Film Institute Awards.

Plot

Following the death of her mother Tessa (Pamela Rabe), a young woman, returns after many years to the weather-beaten family home on the shores of Sydney's Botany Bay. But the old family home begins to bring old wounds more and more to life. The story unfolds through flashbacks yet as it progresses the flashbacks merge into the present as it becomes apparent that the situation Tessa has returned to is very much the result of that which passed before.

Cast
Pamela Rabe...Tessa
John Stanton...Frank
Toni Scanlan...Joyce
Linden Wilkinson...Kate
Rita Bruce...Aunty Beryl
Olivia Patten...Millie
Simone Pengelly...Teenage Tessa
Melissa Ippolito...Young Tessa
Fiona Gabb...Teenage Kate
Shelly McShane...Young Kate
Tommy Lewis...Billy
Bill Young...Estate Agent
Barbra Wyndon...Thea
Tony Barry...Salvation Army Man
Ian Spence...Volunteer
Graeme Moore...Mitch

Awards
Nominations
Australian Film Institute 1995:
AFI Award - Best Editing: Veronika Jenet
AFI Award - Best Director: Margot Nash
AFI Award - Best Screenplay: Margot Nash
AFI Award - Best Achievement in Sound: Tony Vaccher, John Dennison, Bronwyn Murphy & John Patterson

External links
 
Vacant Possession at Oz Movies
Vacant Possession on Australian Screen, National Film and Sound Archive

References 

Films set in Sydney
Films shot in Sydney
1995 drama films
1995 films
Australian drama films
1990s English-language films
1990s Australian films
1995 directorial debut films